Andrés Giraldo (born 7 May 1989) is a Colombian footballer who plays for Diriangén FC.

References

1989 births
Living people
Association football wingers
Colombian footballers
Chinandega FC players
Managua F.C. players
A.P.S. Zakynthos players
C.D. Juventud Independiente players
Diriangén FC players
Colombian expatriate footballers
Expatriate footballers in Nicaragua
Expatriate footballers in Greece
Expatriate footballers in El Salvador
Colombian expatriate sportspeople in Nicaragua
Colombian expatriate sportspeople in Greece
Colombian expatriate sportspeople in El Salvador
People from Palmira, Valle del Cauca
Sportspeople from Valle del Cauca Department